Ludwika Szczęsna, SSCJ (18 July 1863 – 7 February 1916) was a Polish Catholic nun and was also the co-founder of the Sisters, Servants of the Most Sacred Heart of Jesus which she established with Józef Sebastian Pelczar. She took the name of "Klara" when she became a nun.

She was cleared for beatification in 2015 after Pope Francis recognized a miracle that was found to have been attributed to her intercession. The beatification was celebrated on 27 September 2015 in Poland; Cardinal Angelo Amato presided on behalf of the pope.

Life
Ludwika Szczęsna was born in Poland in 1863 as the sixth of seven children to Antoni Szczęsny and Franciszka Skorupska. Her mother oversaw her education at home but this was cut short with her mother's death when she was twelve. She continued to live with her father albeit with his second wife.

Her father wanted to arrange a marriage for her when she was seventeen but she opposed this and announced to him her intention to follow her vocation and become a professed religious. She left her home at this time in order to follow her calling and she worked as a seamstress until she was 22 in Mlawa. She - at this time - became a spiritual student of Honorat Koźminski. She joined the Servants of Jesus in 1885 and worked as a tailor in addition to serving as the Superior to the local chapter. She was soon given the task of running a shelter for women in Krakow.

Szczęsna soon met Józef Sebastian Pelczar in 1893 and the two went on to establish their own religious congregation on 15 April 1894. It was after the establishment that she assumed the name of "Klara" in honor of Clare of Assisi. The motto that was selected for the new order was "All for the Heart of Jesus". She served as the first Superior General and opened over 30 houses with the aim of tending to women as well as the sick; this work intensified with the outbreak of World War I.

She died at the beginning of 1916 during World War I. Pelczar continued her work after her death until he died in 1924.

Beatification
The beatification process commenced on 7 April 1994 despite the fact that the local process in Kraków had started on 25 March 1994. The process concluded its work on 15 April 1996 and was ratified on 13 December 1996. The Positio - documentation assembled in the process - was submitted to the Congregation for the Causes of Saints in Rome in 2002.

Pope Benedict XVI approved that she had lived a life of heroic virtue and proclaimed her to be Venerable on 20 December 2012.

The miracle required for beatification was investigated in a process that spanned from 25 April 2004 until 20 March 2007. The process was ratified in 2008 with the documentation sent to Rome. Pope Francis approved the miracle on 5 June 2015 allowing for her to be beatified. She was beatified on 27 September 2015.

References

External links
Hagiography Circle
Saints SQPN
Sister Servants of the Most Sacred Heart of Jesus

1863 births
1916 deaths
Founders of Catholic religious communities
19th-century venerated Christians
20th-century venerated Christians
Beatifications by Pope Francis
Polish beatified people
Venerated Catholics by Pope Benedict XVI